The Glorious First of June is a 1794 play by Richard Brinsley Sheridan. It depicts the Glorious First of June, a British naval victory over the French that took place on 1 June 1794 during the French Revolutionary War. It premiered on 2 July 1794 at the Drury Lane theatre, and was based on newspaper accounts of the battle. It contains a debate on the question of naval patriotism – a key issue at the time. The profits made from the play were donated to the families of those killed in the battle.

Characters
Comodore Broadside
Endless
Old Cottager
Robin
William
Tom Oakum
Ben
Splicem
Boy
Dick
Busy
Cottager's Wife
Mary
Susan
Girl
Cicely
Margaretta
Sailors, Countrymen, Countrylasses

References

Bibliography
 Jenks, Timothy. Naval engagements: patriotism, cultural politics, and the Royal Navy, 1793-1815. Oxford University Press, 2006, 

Plays by Richard Brinsley Sheridan
1794 plays
Glorious First of June
West End plays
Plays about war
Plays set in the 18th century